Boxiron is an unincorporated community in Worcester County, Maryland, United States. Boxiron is located at the intersection of Boxiron and Cherrix Lanes, southeast of Snow Hill.

References

Unincorporated communities in Worcester County, Maryland
Unincorporated communities in Maryland